Bostwick is an unincorporated community in Putnam County, Florida, United States, located north of the city of Palatka on U.S. Route 17. It hosts the Bostwick Blueberry Festival annually, in April.

Geography

Notable residents
 Emory H. Price; (December 3, 1899February 11, 1976) was a U.S. Representative from Florida.

References

Unincorporated communities in Putnam County, Florida
Unincorporated communities in Florida